Campion College Australia is a Roman Catholic tertiary educational liberal arts college located at Austin Woodbury Place, Toongabbie in the western suburbs of Sydney, New South Wales, Australia. Named in honour of Saint Edmund Campion, Campion College offers undergraduate studies in the liberal arts and postgraduate studies in Religious Education. The college welcomed its first intake of students in February 2006. The founding president was bioethicist Father John Fleming, and the first graduation ceremony was held in December 2008.

Courses 
Campion offers a Bachelor of Arts in the Liberal Arts as its sole undergraduate degree. The focus of this course is the development of Western culture. The key disciplines are history, literature, philosophy and theology. The program is structured (loosely) chronologically: with students studying the ancient world in first year, the Middle Ages and Enlightenment in second and finishing with modernity and postmodernity in the third and final year. Students may opt to complete a major in any of the four disciplines. Students are also required to complete two science subjects in their final year. They may also elect to study Latin and Greek above their normal study load, with the ability to graduate with an additional Diploma of Classical Languages upon completing eight languages units concurrently with their Bachelor units. Students who do not wish to study for three years may complete the first year of the Bachelor of Arts program and graduate with a Diploma of Liberal Arts - Foundations of the Western Tradition.

In 2020, Campion launched its first postgraduate course, a Graduate Certificate in Religious Education (Primary). The course serves as  professional development for individuals currently working as Religious Education teachers and as a pathway for further learning in theological studies.

Campion College is classed as a Non-Self-Accrediting Institution. Its registration as an institution, and accreditation of courses, are completed through the Tertiary Education Quality and Standards Agency (TEQSA). Accreditation is completed in accordance with the Australian Qualifications Framework. Approval was granted by NSW Department of Education & Training in April 2006 to enrol international students in the Bachelor of Arts. The college is also approved by the Australian Government as a Higher Education provider and as such, eligible students have access to FEE-HELP loans for tuition fees. In 2011, the college had an external quality audit by the Australian Universities Quality Agency (AUQA), with commendations received in relation to the academic and quality culture that have been established.

History 
The College originated in lay initiatives to create a classical liberal education with Catholic characteristics as an alternative to Australia's secular universities.

In its first year of operation, the college's intake was 16 undergraduate students. Since then, new undergraduate enrolments have averaged 30–40 per year, for a total undergraduate student body of around 90.

Campion College publishes a quarterly newsletter, Campion's Brag. The Campion College Student Association (CCSA) publishes a quarterly magazine called The Sextant.

In 2011, the college established the Centre for the Study of Western Tradition to encourage critical reflection and research on the history, literature, languages, philosophy and theology that characterise Western civilisation and culture, in order to raise the profile of these vital disciplines in Australian tertiary education. The Centre holds conferences and symposia relating to its central research themes.

Campus 
The college's  campus and grounds had been a Marist Fathers seminary which was dedicated to, and at one time held relics of, Saint Peter Chanel. The campus houses a chapel, library, accommodation, lecture and tutorial rooms, kitchens, and student areas. In 2018, the college constructed two new residential houses on-site, providing accommodation for an additional 34 students. In 2020, the college received funding and approval to construct a new academic centre on campus, including a new library, lecture theatres, tutorial rooms and dining hall.

See also 

 Catholic education in Australia
 Tertiary education in Australia

References

External links

Universities in Sydney
Catholic universities and colleges in Australia
Educational institutions established in 2006
2006 establishments in Australia
Liberal arts colleges